Mongolia sent a delegation consisting of two male cross-country skiers to compete at the 2010 Winter Paralympics in Vancouver, British Columbia, Canada.

Cross-country skiing

See also
Mongolia at the 2010 Winter Olympics
Mongolia at the Paralympics

References

External links
Vancouver 2010 Paralympic Games official website
International Paralympic Committee official website

Nations at the 2010 Winter Paralympics
2010
Paralympics